is a Japanese badminton player. He graduated from the Saitama Sakae high school, and was part of the Unysis team since 2017. He won his first international title at the 2018 Yonex / K&D Graphics International tournament.

Career 
Watanabe started his badminton career when he was four years old, entered the badminton club under the influence of his sister. He later concentrate his badminton career in the kindergarten, and when he was in the elementary school, he won the Saitama school championships in third consecutive years. Watanabe entered the Saitamasakaechugakko Koto school, and won the singles title at the national junior championships, also placed third in the doubles event. He was part of the national junior team that competed at the 2015 and 2016 Asia and World Junior Championships, winning the World boys' singles bronze medal in 2015, he also helped the national team win the 2015, 2016 Asian, also 2016 World Junior bronze medals.

In 2018, Watanabe became the runner-up at the BWF Super 100 tournament Russian Open.

Achievements

BWF World Junior Championships 
Boys' singles

BWF World Tour 
The BWF World Tour, which was announced on 19 March 2017 and implemented in 2018, is a series of elite badminton tournaments sanctioned by the Badminton World Federation (BWF). The BWF World Tours are divided into levels of World Tour Finals, Super 1000, Super 750, Super 500, Super 300 (part of the HSBC World Tour), and the BWF Tour Super 100.

Men's singles

BWF International Challenge/Series 
Men's singles

  BWF International Challenge tournament
  BWF International Series tournament
  BWF Future Series tournament

References

External links 
 

1999 births
Living people
Sportspeople from Saitama Prefecture
Japanese male badminton players
21st-century Japanese people